Saint-Féliu-d'Amont is a commune in the Pyrénées-Orientales department in southern France.

Geography 
Saint-Féliu-d'Amont is in the canton of La Vallée de la Têt and in the arrondissement of Perpignan.

Population

Notable people 
 Christian Bourquin (1954-) : politician born in Saint-Féliu-d'Amont.

See also
Communes of the Pyrénées-Orientales department

References

Communes of Pyrénées-Orientales